There are two all-time table of the Norwegian Premier League, one which includes all matches in the top league from 1948, which includes the Norwegian Main League and onwards, and one which starts with the introduction of the First Division, later renamed the Premier League or Tippeligaen for its sponsor.

Table
The table is up to date as of the end of the 2013 season.

References

Eliteserien
All-time_football_league_tables